The 1980 Turkish presidential election refers to the unsuccessful elections to choose the country's seventh president, to succeed Fahri Korutürk. The first round of the elections held on 12 March 1980. There were 115 unsuccessful rounds until 12 September 1980. The elections ended with a coup d'état on that date.

History 
The election agenda began as incumbent president Fahri Korutürk's 7-year term was to finish, in April 1980. According to the 1961 constitution, the winning candidate needed two thirds of the votes of the total members of parliament. Faik Türün was the Justice Party's (AP) candidate and Muhsin Batur was Republican People's Party's candidate; both were retired army generals. During the five and a half months of elections İhsan Sabri Çağlayangil, an AP member, was acting president. Neither of the candidates reached the 2/3 of votes required to become president. The last round was held on 11 September 1980, and the speaker of the parliament scheduled the next session for 12 September 1980 at 15:00 hours. The next session was called off because of the coup d'état.

See also 

 1982 Turkish constitutional referendum

References 

1980
Indirect elections
1980 elections in Turkey
September 1980 events in Europe